New Hampshire law required a winning candidate to receive votes from a majority of voters (16.7% of votes). No candidate won such a majority on the first ballot, so a second ballot was held February 2, 1789.

See also 
 1789 New Hampshire's at-large congressional district special election
 1788 and 1789 United States House of Representatives elections

United States House of Representatives elections in New Hampshire
New Hampshire
New Hampshire
United States House of Representatives
United States House of Representatives